On 2 April 2005, Pope John Paul II died at the age of 84. His funeral was held on 8 April, followed by the novendiales devotional in which the Catholic Church observed nine days of mourning.

In February 1996 Pope John Paul II had introduced revisions to papal funeral ceremonies, including changes to repose and burial formalities. These revisions were enacted through the apostolic constitution , and applied to his own funeral.

The funeral had around four million mourners gathering in Rome in the wake of his death.

Ecumenical Patriarch Bartholomew I of Constantinople was in the honorary first seat in the section reserved for churches not in full communion with the Catholic Church. This was the first time an ecumenical patriarch attended a papal funeral since the East–West Schism.

Death 
On 2 April 2005, Joaquín Navarro-Valls, director of the Holy See Press Office, announced that John Paul II had died that day, at 84 years old, at 9:37 p.m. in his private apartment.

Rite of papal death
When John Paul II died, the Camerlengo Eduardo Martínez Somalo removed the Pope's Ring of the Fisherman from his finger, then ceremonially crushed it with the ceremonial silver hammer in the presence of members of the College of Cardinals. 

While his predecessors had been embalmed after death, the Vatican claimed that Pope John Paul II was not embalmed and lay in state without normal treatment for preservation, which is evident by the grey colour taken on by the body. Also, it was customary for popes to have their organs removed after death. Pope Pius X ended this practice during his reign, and the wish of some Poles that John Paul II's heart be buried in Poland was not obliged.

Mass of Repose
A first Mass of Repose, such as is offered for anyone baptised in the Catholic Church, commemorating the sending of the soul to God, was led by Cardinal Angelo Sodano, Cardinal Secretary of State, on 3 April 2005, the day after the death of the Pope. That Sunday service coincided with the celebration of the Feast of Divine Mercy, a memorial feast instituted by Pope John Paul II himself. The service was followed by the recitation of the Regina Caeli, at which Archbishop Leonardo Sandri, Substitute of the Secretariat of State read out the words that John Paul II himself wrote for the occasion and was due to recite.

Rite of Visitation

The body of John Paul II was dressed in his vestments and moved to the Clementine Hall on the third level (considered the second floor) of the Apostolic Palace on 3 April.

Requiem Mass

Cardinal Joseph Ratzinger celebrated the Mass of Requiem on 8 April at 10:00 am CEST (08:00 UTC), by virtue of his office as Dean of the College of Cardinals.

Processional

As the Mass of Requiem began, the doors of St. Peter's Basilica were locked with dignitaries asked to stand outside the church. Only the College of Cardinals and the patriarchs and presiding metropolitans of the Eastern Catholic Churches were allowed inside for a private ceremony in which John Paul was placed in a cypress coffin, the first of three. Before being laid in the coffin, Archbishops Marini and Stanisław Dziwisz had the honour of placing a white silk veil over the face of the pope (a tradition started by Leo XIII). It was his last official act of service to the pope as his papal secretary.

Homily
After kissing the text of the Book of the Gospels, cardinal Ratzinger stood before the congregants to offer the homily which included references to the life and service of Pope John Paul II. He spoke in Italian, first greeting the many political figures and religious leaders that had gathered, and then told the story of how the young Karol had answered the Lord's call, and became a priest after the persecution of the Nazis, the answer of the command: "Follow me!". Cardinal Ratzinger also told of John Paul II's life as a bishop, cardinal, and pope, frequently applying scripture to the pope's life. Finally, he told of the pope's devotion to Mary and the Divine Mercy of Christ. The cardinal's last words were about the end of Pope John Paul II's life: 'We entrust your dear soul to the Mother of God, your Mother, who guided you each day and who will guide you now to the eternal glory of her Son, our Lord Jesus Christ."

Some construed the ending of the homily to mean that the pope had already entered into heaven, and had become a saint.

Rite of Interment
The people of Poland had wished for the heart of John Paul II to be removed from his body and transferred to Wawel Cathedral to be buried alongside the greatest of Poland's monarchs and National heroes. Cardinal Martínez Somalo said that the request would not be obliged, as per the dead Pope's wish not to have any parts of his body removed during preparation for the funeral.

Cardinal Martínez Somalo, Camerlengo of the Roman Church, then presided over the Rite of Interment. It was a private service witnessed only by the highest-ranking members of the College of Cardinals. As is custom, Pope John Paul II was entombed in three nested coffins. The cypress coffin was sealed and tied with three red silk ribbons.

The unified coffin was lowered into the ground, as the Pope requested, and covered with a plain stone slab featuring his name and dates of his pontificate. Pope John Paul II asked that his burial be like that of Pope Paul VI, not in an elaborate sarcophagus and ornate above-ground tomb, but in "bare earth". His remains lay in this tomb for six years before it was exhumed to prepare for his beatification in 2011.

The middle plaques bear the following statement in Latin:

Dignitaries

Novendiales

Controversies
One of the most controversial honourees was cardinal Bernard Francis Law, Archpriest of the Basilica di Santa Maria Maggiore, scheduled to preside a novendial on 11 April. During his tenure as Archbishop of Boston, cardinal Law was accused of having mishandled cases of sexual abuse at the hands of diocesan priests. The event sparked the nationwide Roman Catholic Church sex abuse scandal in the dioceses of the United States.

Several members of the Survivors Network of those Abused by Priests (SNAP) flew to Rome to protest saying Cardinal Law's place of honour was painful to sexual abuse victims and embarrassing to Catholics. Just as the group's members arrived at St. Peter's Basilica, led by founder Barbara Blaine, police officers escorted them outside the confines of St. Peter's Square. Blaine was unable to pass out fliers to people walking into the Mass offered by Cardinal Law.

Blaine had earlier told reporters in a press conference, "We are the sons and daughters of the Catholic family who were raped, sodomized and sexually molested by priests. At this time, we should be able to focus on the Holy Father's death, instead of Cardinal Law's prominence."

See also
 Testament of Pope John Paul II
 Death and funeral of Pope Benedict XVI

References

Further reading
 Venerable resting place for the Pope, BBC News
 John Paul buried in St Peter's crypt on 8 April 2005 at 2:30pm, BBC News

External links 

 

 Daily Bulletin of the Holy See Press Office – No. 0184

 Archived films of events during the Vacant See (including the funeral) (Vatican TV)
 Link to official funeral rites programme from the Vatican. Text mainly in Latin and Italian, including other languages heard in the service
 Text of eulogy buried with Pope John Paul II (Latin)
 Text of eulogy buried with Pope John Paul II (English translation)

History of the papacy

2005 in Christianity
John Paul Ii, Pope
2005 in international relations
John Paul Ii, Pope
2005 in Vatican City
April 2005 events in Europe
2000s in Rome
Media coverage and representation